Lentzea is a Gram-positive, mesophilic and aerobic genus from the family Pseudonocardiaceae.

References

Further reading
 

Pseudonocardiales
Bacteria genera